The Galax Leafs were a minor league baseball team based in Galax, Virginia. From 1946 to 1950, the Galax Leafs played exclusively as members of the Class D level Blue Ridge League, winning the 1947 championship and 1948 pennant. The Galax Leafs were a minor league affiliate of the New York Giants in 1950. The Leafs hosted minor league home games at Felts Park.

History
Minor league baseball was first hosted in Galax, Virginia in 1946. The Galax "Leafs" became charter members of the four–team Class D level Blue Ridge League. The Mount Airy Graniteers, Radford Rockets and Salem Friends joined Galax as charter members in beginning 1946 league play, which commenced on May 1, 1946.

The Galax, Virginia use of the "Leafs" moniker corresponds to local plant life. The "Galax Leaf," a type of green, waxy leaf is indigenous to the region. Today, Galax, Virginia is host of the annual musical Galax & Leaf Festival.

In their first season of play, the 1946 Galax Leafs finished last in the final Blue Ridge League standings. The Rockets ended the season with a record of 30–78, to place 4th, playing under manager Rex Phillips. The Leafs finished the season 42.0 games behind the 1st place Salem Friends/Lenoir Red Sox team, as no playoffs were held. Joining the Leafs during the season from Mount Airy, Eddie Morgan led the Blue Ridge League with both 16 home runs and 127 RBI.

The 1947 Galax Leafs won the Blue Ridge League championship. As the league implemented a new playoff system, Galax ended the regular season with a record of 77–47 and finished 3.5 games ahead the 2nd place Mount Airy Graniteers, with Eddie Morgan serving as player/manager. In the 1st round of the playoffs, the Leafs defeated the Radford Rockets 3 games to 1 in their series to advance. In the Finals, the Galax Leafs defeated the Lenoir Red Sox in seven games to win the championship. Player/manager Eddie Morgan hit a league leading .375 with 11 home runs and a league leading 103 RBI in leading Galax to the championship.

Continuing Blue Ridge League play in 1948, the Galax Leafs won the pennant as the league expanded to six teams. With a record of 75–48, playing under manager Harold Kase, the Leafs finished 4.5 games ahead of the 2nd place North Wilkesboro Flashers in the regular season standings. In the 1st round of the playoffs, Galax defeated the Radford Rockets 3 games to 0 to advance. In the Finals, the  Mount Airy Graniteers defeated Galax Leafs 4 games to 3. Pitcher Cecil Warren of Galax led the Blue Ridge league with 21 wins.

The Galax Leafs placed 2nd in the six–team 1949 Blue Ridge League. The Leafs ended the Blue Ridge League regular season with a 66–61 record, finishing 2.5 games behind the 1st place Mt. Airy Graniteers, while playing under managers Bob Latshaw and Steve Sloboda. In the playoffs, the North Wilkesboro Flashers defeated Galax Leafs 4 games to 2.

In their final season, the 1950 Galax Leafs became a minor league affiliate of the New York Giants. The Leafs ended the 1950 Blue Ridge League regular season with a record of 68–50, playing under manager James Grigg. Galax finished 16.0 games behind the 1st place Elkin Blanketeers in the six–team Blue Ridge League final regular season standings. In their final games, the Galax Leafs lost their playoff series to Elkin 3 games to 0. The Blue Ridge League permanently folded after the 1950 season. Bob Horan of Galax led the Blue Ridge with 14 home runs, 104 runs and 153 total hits, while Leafs' teammate Mitchell Mozejko led the league with 18 wins.

Galax, Virginia has not hosted another minor league franchise.

The ballpark
The Galax Leafs were noted to have played minor league home games at Felts Park. The ballpark was reportedly a 2,500 seat ballpark. Today, Felts Park is still in use as a public park with ballfields. The park is located at 601 South Main Street, Galax, Virginia.

Timeline

Year–by–year records

Notable alumni

Eddie Morgan (1946), (1947, MGR)
Jack Warner (1946)

See also
Galax Leafs players

References

External links
Baseball Reference

Defunct minor league baseball teams
Baseball teams established in 1946
Baseball teams disestablished in 1950
Defunct baseball teams in Virginia
Blue Ridge League teams
Galax, Virginia
New York Giants minor league affiliates